Estudo para "Partida da Monção" or Departure for Monsoon is an oil painting on a canvas that was completed in 1897 by Brazilian painter José Ferraz de Almeida Júnior, a representation of Brazilian naturalism and realism.

Currently, the work is housed at the Museu do Ipiranga in São Paulo. It is quite a large painting, with dimensions of 390 by 640 centimeters (13 by 21 feet).

The "monsoon" is a reference to the Portuguese term for a river expedition from coastal to inland Brazil, known as "monsoons", which were common during the late 18th and early 19th centuries. The painting has a scene of the Port of Araritaguaba (now Porto Feliz, in São Paulo), on the banks of the Tietê River. The destination was Cuiabá, located in Mato Grosso, Brazil.

References 

Brazilian paintings
19th-century paintings
Oil paintings